Óscar Esaú Duarte Gaitán (born 3 June 1989) is a professional footballer who plays as a centre-back for Saudi Professional League club Al-Wehda. Born in Nicaragua, he represents the Costa Rica national team.

Club career
Duarte was born in Catarina, Masaya, Nicaragua. After making 52 appearances in five years at Costa Rican club Deportivo Saprissa, Duarte joined Club Brugge in the Belgian Pro League in 2013.

On 24 June 2022, Duarte joined Saudi Arabian club Al-Wehda.

International career
Duarte made his debut for the Costa Rica national football team against Jamaica on 17 November 2010 and played for the team at the 2011 Copa Centroamericana, where they lost to Honduras in the final.

In June 2014, Duarte was named in Costa Rica's squad for the 2014 FIFA World Cup, becoming the first Nicaragua-born player at a World Cup finals.

In the team's opening match, he scored his first goal for Los Ticos in a 3–1 defeat of Uruguay. In their second match, the team beat Italy, a 1–0 win that qualified Costa Rica for the knockout stage. Costa Rica completed the group stage unbeaten, recording a second consecutive clean sheet in a 0–0 draw with England in Belo Horizonte. On 29 June, Duarte was sent off for receiving two yellow cards in Costa Rica's round of 16 match against Greece. The team advanced via a penalty shootout to the quarter-finals for the first time in their history, where they lost on penalties to the Netherlands.

In May 2018 he was named in Costa Rica’s 23-man squad for the 2018 FIFA World Cup in Russia.

Career statistics

International

Scores and results list Costa Rica's goal tally first, score column indicates score after each Duarte goal.

Honours
Saprissa
Costa Rican Primera División: Clausura 2008, Apertura 2008

Brugge
Belgian Pro League: 2015–16
Belgian Cup: 2015

Notes

References

External links

 
 
 

Living people
1989 births
Nicaraguan emigrants to Costa Rica
Naturalized citizens of Costa Rica
Costa Rican people of Nicaraguan descent
Costa Rican men's footballers
People from Masaya Department
Association football defenders
Deportivo Saprissa players
Puntarenas F.C. players
Club Brugge KV players
RCD Espanyol footballers
Levante UD footballers
Al-Wehda Club (Mecca) players
Liga FPD players
Belgian Pro League players
La Liga players
Saudi Professional League players
Costa Rica international footballers
Costa Rican expatriate footballers
Expatriate footballers in Belgium
Costa Rican expatriate sportspeople in Belgium
Expatriate footballers in Spain
Costa Rican expatriate sportspeople in Spain
Expatriate footballers in Saudi Arabia
Costa Rican expatriate sportspeople in Saudi Arabia
Copa Centroamericana-winning players
2011 Copa Centroamericana players
2011 CONCACAF Gold Cup players
2011 Copa América players
2014 FIFA World Cup players
2014 Copa Centroamericana players
Copa América Centenario players
2018 FIFA World Cup players
2019 CONCACAF Gold Cup players
2021 CONCACAF Gold Cup players
2022 FIFA World Cup players